W. B. Adams Stadium is a 5,500-seat stadium in Ferrum, Virginia where it serves as home to the Ferrum College football team as well as the school's recently founded Men's Lacrosse team.
The stadium was completed in 1960 and is on a complex with a full-sized practice field.

External links
 Information at Ferrum College

College football venues
Ferrum Panthers football
Sports venues in Virginia
Buildings and structures in Franklin County, Virginia
American football venues in Virginia